C. B. Harding (sometimes credited as CB Harding) is an American film director, screenwriter, producer and cinematographer.

Producer/Director filmography
 Delta Farce (2007)
 Blue Collar Comedy Tour: One For the Road (2006)
 The Ron White Show (2005) (TV)
 Blue Collar Comedy Tour Rides Again (2004) (TV)
 The Osbourne Family Christmas Special (2003) (TV)
 Blue Collar Comedy Tour: The Movie (2003)
 Loveblind (2000)
 Passion Cove (2000)
 The Passenger (1997)
 Complicity (2012)

Writer filmography 

 Dude... We're Going to Rio (2003)
Complicity 2012

Cinematographer filmography 
 The Passenger(1997)

References

American film directors
Year of birth missing (living people)
Living people